Perth and Kinross is one of the 32 council areas of Scotland and a Lieutenancy Area. It borders onto the Aberdeenshire, Angus, Argyll and Bute, Clackmannanshire, Dundee, Fife, Highland and Stirling council areas. Perth  is the administrative centre. With the exception of a large area of south-western Perthshire, the council area mostly corresponds to the historic counties of Perthshire and Kinross-shire.

Perthshire and Kinross-shire shared a joint county council from 1929 until 1975. The area formed a single local government district in 1975 within the Tayside region under the Local Government (Scotland) Act 1973, and was then reconstituted as a unitary authority (with a minor boundary adjustment) in 1996 by the Local Government etc. (Scotland) Act 1994.

Geographically the area is split by the Highland Boundary Fault into a more mountainous northern part and a flatter southern part. The northern area is a popular tourist spot, while agriculture makes an important contribution to the southern part of the area.

The area is run by Perth and Kinross Council, and is represented by members of the Scottish National Party within both the Scottish Parliament and the Parliament of the United Kingdom.

History

The historical counties of Perthshire and Kinross-shire were separate entities prior to 1975. Under the terms of the 1973 Local Government (Scotland) Act Kinross-shire became part of the Tayside region, while Perthshire was split between the Tayside and Central regions. Under the terms of the Local Government etc. (Scotland) Act 1994 these regions were dissolved in 1996 and the unitary authority of Perth and Kinross was created from the areas of Perthshire and Kinross-shire which were previously part of the Tayside region.

Geography

The Highland Boundary Fault runs across the region from the northeast to the southwest. This roughly divides the area between highland Perthshire, including part of the Grampian Mountains, to the north, and lowland Perthshire and Kinross to the south. The highland area is intersected with glacial valleys, often containing ribbon lakes, including Loch Tay and Loch Earn. The lowland area is a fertile region lying within the Central Lowlands.

Economy
In the southern part of Perth and Kinross agriculture plays an important part of the local economy. This includes the cultivation of fruits, fodder, wheat and seed potatoes.

The scenic nature of the northern part of Perth and Kinross makes tourism an important part of the economy. The Forestry Commission controls large parts of the area, which is also home to a number of hydroelectric dams.

City
Perth

Towns and villages

Towns

Villages

Places of interest
Ashintully Castle
Atholl Country Life Museum
Ben Lawers
Blackhall Roman Camps
Blair Atholl Mill
Blair Castle
Cateran Trail
Cairngorms National Park
Castle Menzies
Clan Donnachaidh Centre
Cluny House Gardens
Dirnanean House
Drummond Castle
Edradour Distillery
Elcho Castle
Forest of Atholl
Fortingall Yew
Glen Lyon
Grampian Mountains
Kindrogan House
Lendrick Muir School
Loch Earn
Loch Lomond and the Trossachs National Park
Loch Rannoch
Loch Tay
Melville Monument
Portmoak
Rannoch Moor
Strathearn
Whitefield Castle

Politics and governance

Local Council

Following the 2022 Perth and Kinross Council election, part of the Scotland wide local elections, the composition of the local council was as follows:

Scottish Parliament
Perth and Kinross is covered by two Scottish Parliament constituencies and one electoral region. Following the 2021 Scottish Parliament election these two constituencies - Perthshire South and Kinross-shire and Perthshire North - are held respectively by Jim Fairlie and John Swinney, both members of the Scottish National Party. Following the same election the electoral region - Mid Scotland and Fife - is represented by four members of the Scottish Conservatives, two members of Scottish Labour, and one member of the Scottish Greens.

UK Parliament
Perth and Kinross is covered by two United Kingdom Parliament constituencies; Perth and North Perthshire and Ochil and South Perthshire. Following the 2019 UK Parliamentary General Election these seats are respectively held by Pete Wishart and John Nicolson, both for the Scottish National Party.

Referendums
On 18 September 2014, Perth and Kinross voted strongly "No" in the Scottish Independence Referendum, with a majority of 60.2% on a record turnout of 86.9%
.

On 23 June 2016, Perth and Kinross voted in favour of remain in the Brexit referendum, with a majority of 61.1% on a turnout of 73.7%.

See also
Perth and Kinross Council
Perth and Kinross Spirit of Youth Awards
List of places in Perth and Kinross

References

External links

Perth and Kinross Council

The Perthshire Diary – 365 history stories
Perth City
A Vision of Britain Through Time: A vision of Perth and Kinross

 
Lieutenancy areas of Scotland
Highlands and Islands of Scotland
Council areas of Scotland